The Lickerish Quartet (Italian: Esotika Erotika Psicotika) is a 1970 erotic drama film produced and directed by Radley Metzger. It was filmed in Italian and later dubbed into English. The film was written by Metzger and Michael DeForrest.

Plot 
In their castle, a wealthy couple (Frank Wolff and Erika Remberg) watch an erotic movie with their adult son, played by Paolo Turco. Later that evening, at a local carnival, they spot a woman (Silvana Venturelli) who appears to be one of the performers in the film, and decide to take her home with them. Although a subsequent viewing of the film calls the woman's identity into question, their house guest quickly succeeds in seducing the various members of the family, resulting in the revelation of certain facts, fears and desires.

Cast 
 Silvana Venturelli as The visitor
 Frank Wolff as Castle owner
 Erika Remberg as His wife
 Paolo Turco as Her son

Reception 
The Lickerish Quartet received critical praise upon its release by many critics, especially Andy Warhol and Vincent Canby, as being one of the first films with graphic sex to have Hollywood-like production values. Vincent Canby of The New York Times noted: “I must say I find most of Mr. Metzger’s movies entertaining to watch. They are so, well, ripe with incredible color and décor and movement.” Andy Warhol, who helped begin the Golden Age of Porn with his 1969 film Blue Movie, was a fan of Metzger's film work and commented that The Lickerish Quartet, was “an outrageously kinky masterpiece”. However, Roger Ebert found the film to be pretentious and the plot convoluted.

Notes
According to one film reviewer, Radley Metzger's films, including those made during the Golden Age of Porn (1969–1984), are noted for their "lavish design, witty screenplays, and a penchant for the unusual camera angle". Another reviewer noted that his films were "highly artistic — and often cerebral ... and often featured gorgeous cinematography". Film and audio works by Metzger have been added to the permanent collection of the Museum of Modern Art (MoMA) in New York City.

References

Further reading
 
 Heffernan, Kevin, "A social poetics of pornography", Quarterly Review of Film and Video, Volume 15, Issue 3, December 1994, pp. 77–83. .

External links
 The Lickerish Quartet at  MUBI (related to The Criterion Collection)
 
 The Lickerish Quartet – Behind The Scenes
 The Lickerish Quartet – director Radley Metzger & Andy Warhol (1;2)

Films directed by Radley Metzger
Films scored by Stelvio Cipriani
Films set in castles
Italian erotic drama films
Italian mystery drama films
1970 films
1970s erotic drama films
1970 drama films
1970s Italian films